Route 575 is a  long east–west secondary highway in the western portion of New Brunswick, Canada.

The route starts at Route 105 in Hartland near Lower Becaguimec Island. The road travels east through a mostly forested area through Pole Hill, where it crosses the South Branch Becaguimec Stream. It then ends at Route 104 in Cloverdale.

History

See also

References

575
575